Alakoç may refer to:

Alakoç, Çamlıdere, village in Turkey
Alakoç, Çermik

People with the surname
Metin Alakoç (born 1942), Turkish sport wrestler